HD 2638 is a ternary star system system in the equatorial constellation of Cetus. The pair have an angular separation of  along a position angle of 166.7°, as of 2015. This is system too faint to be visible to the naked eye, having a combined apparent visual magnitude of 9.44; a small telescope is required. The distance to this system is 179.5 light years based on parallax, and it is drifting further away with a radial velocity of +9.6 km/s. The magnitude 7.76 star HD 2567 forms a common proper motion companion to this pair at projected separation 839″.

They have a combined stellar classification of K1V. The primary component is a G-type main-sequence star with a class of G8V. It is smaller and less massive than the Sun, and has a lower luminosity. The secondary is a binary consisting of who red dwarf stars on close orbit with combined mass less than half the mass of the primary, and a composite spectral class of M1V.

Planetary system
In 2005, the discovery of an extrasolar planet HD 2638 b orbiting the primary was announced by the Geneva Extrasolar Planet Search Team. The planet has a mass 0.48 times that of Jupiter and 152.6 times that of Earth. The planet existence was placed under doubt in 2015 due to discovered additional stellar companions.

See also
List of extrasolar planets

References

G-type main-sequence stars
M-type main-sequence stars
Triple star systems
Planetary systems with one confirmed planet

Cetus (constellation)
Durchmusterung objects
002638
002350
J00295988-0545502